Sinp'o station is a railway station in Sinp'o, South Hamgyŏng, North Korea. It is on located on the P'yŏngra line of the Korean State Railway.

References

Railway stations in North Korea